The 37th running of the Tour of Flanders cycling classic was held on Sunday, 5 April 1953. Dutch rider Wim van Est won the race in a two-man sprint with Désiré Keteleer in Wetteren. 44 of 213 riders finished.

Route
The race started in Ghent and finished in Wetteren – totaling 253 km. The course featured five categorized climbs:
 Kluisberg
 Kwaremont
 Kruisberg
 Edelareberg
 Kloosterstraat (Geraardsbergen)

Results

References

1953
Tour of Flanders
Tour of Flanders
Tour of Flanders
Tour of Flanders